Ministry of Fisheries is a ministerial office jurisdicted by Government of West Bengal.

Ministerial Team
This department is mainly used:
To increase fish production by optimum utilization of all water bodies. 
To create infrastructure for harvest management. 
To develop for enabling eco-system for adoption of scientific pisci-culture.
To strive for socio-economic uplift of the fishermen at large mass.
To ensure availability of fish at affordable cost to the masses.

References

Government of West Bengal
Government departments of West Bengal
West Bengal